These are family trees of the Norse gods showing kin relations among gods and other beings in Nordic mythology. Each family tree gives an example of relations according to principally Eddic material however precise links vary between sources. In addition, some beings are identified by some sources and scholars.

Key 
 Æsir are indicated with boldface

 Vanir are indicated with italics

 Other beings such as jötnar and humans are indicated with standard font.

Æsir

Vanir

Angrboða and Loki

Diversity in belief
While the above family trees are based principally on Eddic material, it is widely accepted that the Eddas do not represent the worldview of all Nordic, or more widely Germanic heathens. Terry Gunnell has similarly challenged the concept of all Germanic pagans throughout the Viking Age believing in a single, universal pantheon of gods that all lived in Asgard and were ruled by Odin. Cultural exchange of both ideas and practices occurred across the soft cultural boundaries with neighbouring peoples from broad cultural groups such as Celts, Sámi, Baltic peoples, and, particularly later on, Christians. Geographical variation in religious practices and beliefs was also seen, which together with external influence made the belief systems dynamic, changing over time from the Nordic Bronze Age into the Viking age.

In the Early Medieval period, Odin was principally a god of the warrior elite, however, due to his close association with skalds, whose poetry was preserved in works such as the Prose Edda and Heimskringla, he is highly represented in extant sources on Nordic pre-Christian religion. Snorri Sturluson also seems to have a preference towards the aristocratic-centred cosmology as opposed to the views more likely held by the wider population. The rise to prominence of male, war-oriented gods such as Odin, relative to protective female gods with a closer association to fertility and watery sites, has been proposed to have taken place around 500 CE, coinciding with the development of an expansionist aristocratic military class in southern Scandinavia. .  

Very rarely in the Eddic stories are the gods described as forming a large family, instead typically acting individually or in groups of three. Gunnell puts forward the idea that the stories did not originate in the same cultural environment, but instead were collected over a wide geographic area and later compiled. This variation may be the cause of the apparent conflicts between sources, such as the most closely associated female god to Odin, which Gunnell suggests never formed a single unified system. He further puts forward the idea that Odinic myths centred on hierarchical assemblies and feasts originated in, and reflected, the halls of the elite, while the rural population would be more familiar with tales regarding Freyr and Thor; these two gods have a significantly more prominent position than Odin in Icelandic and Norwegian place names, sagas and Landnámabók. Gunnell suggests that Freyr, whose cult was centred in Uppland in Sweden, as another figure who acts more as an allfather than Odin, based on his diverse roles in farming, ruling and warfare.

Gunnell further argues that in stories regarding Thor, he is typically highly independent, requiring little aid from other figures. He notes that Thor would fit well into the role of a chief god, being associated with trees, high-seat pillars and rain, and is called upon for help at sea and against Christian missionaries. Some sources, such as the prologue to the Prose Edda suggest that Thor was viewed by some as the father of Odin, and it has been argued that Thor was known in Northern Europe prior to the arrival of the cult of Odin, and thus would not have been originally viewed there as his son. 

It has been argued that Odin began to increasingly incorporate elements from subordinated gods and took on a role as the centre of a family that became depicted as living together. This conception, more akin to the Olympian pantheon, may have been facilitated by large things in which a diversity of peoples assembled, each potentially favouring an individual god.

See also
 Anglo-Saxon royal genealogies
 Horses of the Æsir
 List of Germanic deities
 Norse cosmology

Notes

References

Bibliography

Primary

Secondary
 
 
 
 
 
 
 
 

Norse mythology
Norse deities
Norse mythology